The Appomattox Court House National Historical Park is a preserved 19th-century village in Appomattox County, Virginia. The village is the site of the Battle of Appomattox Court House, and contains the McLean House, where the surrender of the Army of Northern Virginia under Robert E. Lee to Union commander Ulysses S. Grant took place on April 9, 1865, an event widely symbolic of the end of the American Civil War.  The village itself began as the community of Clover Hill, which was made the county seat of Appomattox County in the 1840s.  The village of Appomattox Court House entered a stage of decline after it was bypassed by a railroad in 1854.  In 1930, the United States War Department was authorized to erect a monument at the site, and in 1933 the War Department's holdings there was transferred to the National Park Service.  The site was greatly enlarged in 1935, and a restoration of the McLean House was planned but was delayed by World War II.  In 1949, the restored McLean House was reopened to the public.  Several restored buildings (including the McLean House and the courthouse), as well as a number of original 19th-century structures.

Antebellum history 

The antebellum village started out as "Clover Hill". The village was a stop along the Richmond-Lynchburg stagecoach road. It was also the site of organizational meetings, so when Appomattox County was established by an Act on February 8, 1845, Clover Hill village became the county seat. Appomattox County was formed from parts of Buckingham, Prince Edward, Charlotte, and Campbell counties. The jurisdiction took its name from the headwaters that emanate there, the Appomattox River; the name Appomattox was believed to originate with the Apumetec tribe of Native Americans.

From about 1842, Hugh Raine owned most of the Clover Hill area. He obtained it from his brother John Raine who defaulted on his loans. The state designated  to be taken as a location for county government buildings. The courthouse was to be built across the Stage Road from the Clover Hill Tavern's stable, with the jail behind the courthouse. In late 1845, Hugh Raine and another of his brothers sold sold the Clover Hill area to Samuel D. McDearmon. McDearmon attempted to sell the lots in Clover Hill, but with little success. While the village did grow, in 1854, the decision to route a railroad through nearby Appomattox Depot led to many business leaving Appomattox Court House for the Appomattox Depot area. Around the same time, the stage route into Appomattox Court House was discontinued, and the village entered a decline.

Civil War and further decline 
In early April 1865, during the end of the American Civil War, Confederate States Army forces commanded by General Robert E. Lee were being pursued by Union Army troops commanded by Lieutenant General Ulysses S. Grant.  Trapped at Appomattox Court House, Lee's troops attacked on April 9 in the Battle of Appomattox Court House, but were unsuccessful.  That day, Lee met with Grant to discuss terms of surrender at the McLean House.  After discussion, Lee signed surrender terms that day, and on April 12, the Confederate Army of Northern Virginia laid down its arms and marched away.  While the war continued after the surrender of Lee's army, the surrender at Appomattox Court House has become widely symbolic of the defeat of the Confederacy.  The war's end did not stop the decline of the village, and when the county's records were destroyed in an 1892 courthouse fire, it was decided to move the county seat to the railroad community at Appomattox Depot, which became the town of Appomattox.

Park development history 
In 1892, after the courthouse had burned and the McLean House had been dismantled, George B. Davis learned of the deteriorating state of the village and received permission to have metal tablets placed at the locations of important historic sites at the village. In 1930, the United States Congress passed legislation to have the United States War Department acquire a site at the village for a monument relating to the 1865 surrender, and three years later, the War Department's holdings at Appomattox Court House were transferred to the National Park Service. The site's name was changed from the "Appomattox Battlefield Site" to "Appomattox Court House National Historical Monument" in 1935 as part of legislation that authorized the park to be increased in size and for the McLean House to be reconstructed; the name change to "Appomattox Court House National Historical Park" occurred in 1954. World War II delayed reconstruction at the site, but in 1949, the restored McLean House was opened to the public. On October 15, 1966, the park was listed on the National Register of Historic Places. The village itself has since been restored by the National Park Service, with a number of original 19th-century structures remaining, including the Clover Hill Tavern.

Besides the surviving original structures, the roughly park contains reconstructed historic buildings as well, including the McLean House.  Both a driving tour path and hiking trails are present in the park.  Points of interest along the trails include interpretive signage, the location of Lee's headquarters, and an artillery park including cannons.  The park's visitor's center is located in the rebuilt courthouse.

See also 

 Conclusion of the American Civil War

Notes

References 
 Davis, William C. "Appomattox Court House, Virginia". In Kennedy, Frances E. (ed.). The Civil War Battlefield Guide (2nd ed.). Boston/New York: Houghton Mifflin. pp. 429–432. ISBN 978-0-395-74012-5.
 Marvel, William, A Place Called Appomattox, UNC Press, 2000, 
 Montgomery, Jon B. National Register of Historic Places Registration Form: Appomattox Court House National Historical Park, 1989.

Further reading 
 Burnham, Bill, The Virginia Handbook, Hunter Publishing, Inc, 2005, 
 Davis, Burke, To Appomattox - Nine April Days, 1865, Eastern Acorn Press, 1992, 
 Gutek, Patricia, Plantations and Outdoor Museums in America's Historic South, University of South Carolina Press, 1996, 
 Kaiser, Harvey H., The National Park Architecture Sourcebook, Princeton Architectural Press, 2008, 
 National Park Service, Appomattox Court House: Appomattox Court House National Historical Park, Virginia, U.S. Dept. of the Interior, 2002, 
Winik, Jay, April 1865 / The Month That Saved America, Harper Collins, 2006,

External links

 National Park Service, Appomattox Court House - official site
 Appomattox Court House buildings photos
 A Brief History of Appomattox County
 Surrender at Appomattox, C-SPAN, January 28, 2015

 
Military facilities on the National Register of Historic Places in Virginia
Parks in Appomattox County, Virginia
Battlefields of the Eastern Theater of the American Civil War
Historic districts on the National Register of Historic Places in Virginia
National Register of Historic Places in Appomattox County, Virginia
Historic American Buildings Survey in Virginia
1935 establishments in Virginia
American Civil War on the National Register of Historic Places
Open-air museums in Virginia
National Historical Parks of the United States